Target of an Assassin is a 1977 South African thriller film directed by Peter Collinson and starring Anthony Quinn and John Phillip Law. It was completed in South Africa in 1976 as Tigers Don't Cry, but was not put into general American release for nearly nine years. Other alternate titles include African Rage, The Long Shot, and Fatal Assassin. Based on the novel Running Scared by Jon Burmeister.

Plot
The film is set in a South African hospital. Top-billed Anthony Quinn plays a male nurse, Hobday, assigned to care for a foreign President (Simon Sabela), who escaped an assassination attempt on the day he arrived in South Africa for an official visit. With many threats against his well-being, the leader is heavily guarded around the clock. Hobday manages to kidnap his patient for strictly personal gain, unaware that a hired sniper is still attempting to take the life of the foreign leader while in Hobday's custody.  This leads to a series of curious plot twists leading to a climactic scene with cable cars on a high plateau ridge.

Cast
Anthony Quinn as Ernest Hobday
John Phillip Law as Shannon
Simon Sabela as President Lunda
Marius Weyers as Colonel Albert Pahler
Sandra Prinsloo as Sister Janet Hobart

References

External links

1977 films
South African action thriller films
Films directed by Peter Collinson
Films shot in South Africa
Films set in South Africa
Films about assassinations
English-language South African films
1970s English-language films